Aphaenogaster occidentalis is a species of ant in the family Formicidae.

References

Further reading

External links

 

occidentalis
Articles created by Qbugbot
Insects described in 1895